Helen Alexandra Briscoe Roche, Lady Roche   (née  Gully, formerly Frewen; born 8 June 1934), styled as The Honourable Lady Roche, is a British judicial officer, politician, and philanthropist. A member of the Conservative Party, she served as a parish councillor and serves as the president of the Wharfedale Conservatives. Lady Roche served on the West London bench as a magistrate for forty years. She is an honorary patron of the Queen Charlotte's Ball and served on the ethics committee for St Mary's Hospital in Paddington, Charing Cross Hospital, Chelsea and Westminster Hospital, and Cromwell Hospital. She was created a Member of the Order of the British Empire during the 2017 New Year Honours for voluntary services.

Early life and family 
Lady Roche was born The Honourable Helen Alexandra Briscoe Gully on 8 June 1934 to Royal Naval Reserve officer Lieutenant-Commander Thomas Sutton Evelyn Gully, 3rd Viscount Selby and his wife, Veronica Catherine George. Through her paternal grandmother, Dorothy Evelyn Grey, she is a great-granddaughter of Sir William Grey, who served as Lieutenant-Governor of Bengal and as Governor of Jamaica, and is a descendant of the House of Grey. She is also a descendant of William Court Gully, 1st Viscount Selby, who served as Speaker of the House of Commons prior to his elevation to the peerage. She is a relative of three British Prime Ministers, Sir Winston Churchill, Robert Anthony Eden, 1st Earl of Avon, and Alexander Frederick Douglas-Home, Baron Home of the Hirsel.

Adult life 
In September 2019, Lady Roche and her second husband hosted Queen Charlotte's Ball at Lancaster House. She is an honorary patron of the ball, and of the non-profit organization The London Season, founded by Jennie Hallam-Peel.

Lady Roche served as a magistrate on the West London Bench for forty years and is the president of the Wharfedale branch of the Conservative Party. She has served as a volunteer with the Red Cross, served as a school governor, served on her local parish council, and served on the ethics committee for St Mary's Hospital in Paddington, Charing Cross Hospital, Chelsea and Westminster Hospital, and Cromwell Hospital.

She was made a Member of the Order of the British Empire for voluntary services during the 2017 New Year Honours.

Marriages and issue 
Lady Roche first married Roger d'Hautville Moreton Frewen, grandson of Moreton Frewen and nephew of Clare Sheridan, on 15 November 1952. Her husband was the son of Maria Elena Nunziante di Mignano, a daughter of the Duke of Mignano. The couple had four children:
Jonathan Briscoe Moreton Frewen (born 4 November 1953)
Selina Veronica Clara Frewen (born 3 May 1955, died 1972)
Robert Edward Jerome Frewen (born 10 May 1957)
Charles Grey Justin Frewen (born 13 February 1959)

She and her husband divorced in 1966. She married, secondly to Sir David O'Grady Roche, 5th Baronet on 24 June 1971. Her second husband, the son of Sir Standish O'Grady Roche, 4th Baronet, is Deputy Chairman of the Standing Council of the Baronetage. She and her second husband had three children:
Standish George O'Grady Roche (born 28 April 1972, died 17 July 1974)
David Alexander O'Grady Roche (born 28 January 1976)
Cecilia Evelyn Jonnë Roche (born 23 May 1979)

She and her second husband live at Bridge House in Starbotton, North Yorkshire.

References 

Living people
1934 births
20th-century British philanthropists
20th-century English women politicians
20th-century women philanthropists
21st-century women philanthropists
21st-century English women politicians
Conservative Party (UK) councillors
Daughters of viscounts
English justices of the peace
Members of the Order of the British Empire
Wives of baronets
Women councillors in England
Alexandra
Alexandra